Jacob Brock (July 5, 1810 – September 22, 1876) was a prominent steamboat captain and a pioneer in the early establishment of Enterprise, Florida.

Early life
Jacob Brock was born in Hartford, Connecticut on July 5, 1811. He was the third of twelve children born to Jacob Brock and Abigail Sanders.

Florida
In 1853, Brock bought a steamship that he named the Darlington. In 1860, he built a second steamboat which he named the Hattie after one of his daughters.

References

1811 births
1876 deaths
Steamship captains
Businesspeople from Hartford, Connecticut
19th-century American businesspeople